My Story is a 2018 Indian Malayalam-language romance film directed and produced by Roshni Dinaker and written by Shanker Ramakrishnan. The film stars Prithviraj Sukumaran and Parvathy Thiruvothu in the lead roles. It was released on 6 July 2018.

Plot
A debutant actor Jay and his co-star Tara, an established actress, and a diva, fall in love on the sets of their film. However, Tara is set to marry David, a business tycoon and a bureaucrat who is also the producer of the movie. Twenty years later, Jay is a big movie star but is still in love with Tara and decides to travel to Lisbon to apologize to her for something he did in the past. In the end, Jay finds that he has a daughter with Tara and that she has been also living a dual life with her husband pining over Jay.

Cast

Prithviraj Sukumaran as Jay a.k.a. Jayakrishnan
Parvathy Thiruvothu as Tara and Hima (Dual Role)
Mukul Dev as Sunil
Ganesh Venkatraman as David Eapen
Arun V. Narayan as Sidharth/Bonie(Dual Role)
Nandhu as Joseph Silva
Roger Narayan as himself
Manoj K. Jayan as J. Williams (cinematographer)
Maniyanpilla Raju as Vishwan
Nassar as Keshava Perumaal (Cameo)
Jay Adithya as young Jay
Bhadran as himself (Cameo)
Sona Heiden as Dancemaster

Production
The film marks the directorial debut of film costume designer Roshni Dinaker. Principal photography commenced on 1 November 2016 in Portugal. The filming began on the same date she started her career as a designer years ago. The film was shot in Óbidos and Lisbon, Portugal over 45 days. It was filmed by cinematographer Dudley, Bishwadeep Chatterjee is the sound designer. Roshni also produced the film with her husband O. V. Dinaker. She came up with the plot of My Story after a friend of her named Abhijata Umesh narrated her a story. Impressed by it, she had a discussion with Shankar Ramakrishnan and developed a new story-line, which  became the plot of My Story. The title of the film My Story was the name of the hotel where the writer Ramakrishnan stayed during location scouting in Portugal. Prithviraj also agreed on the title. The film was made on a budget of 18 crore.

Music

The songs were composed by Shaan Rahman, while the background score of the film was composed by Raja Narayan Deb. The lyrics were lyrics written by B. K. Harinarayanan. The soundtrack album consists 7 tracks, released by the label Vibe Music.

Release
My Story was released on 6 July 2018.

Reception
Sajin Shrijith from The New Indian Express, who rated 3 in a scale of 5 found the film's narration interesting, yet few portions "needlessly stretched". "She [Dinaker] isn't interested in winning awards; she is only interested in providing you with two hours of guilty-free entertainment", he wrote. Ayyappan R. of Malayala Manorama wrote: "being a long-term love story it oscillates so much between time zones making you so giddy ... Yet, despite the zig-zagness of the form, the film moves at a smooth languid, almost dreamy, pace, befitting a mature love story". He praised the performances of Prithviraj and Parvathy, editing and colour grading. T. Nirmalkumar of Mathrubhumi rated 3 out of 5 and praised the lead performances, particularly Parvathy's, and said the film "demonstrates the craft which is not of a debutante. It is a love story portrayed on a colourful and unique canvas. But, the engaging first half storytelling is followed by a cliche flashback which made it an ordinary story".

Priya Sreekumar of the Deccan Chronicle appreciated the performances of Prithviraj and Parvathy, cinematography, costumes, sound and music department, but was critical about the screenplay, and rated 2.5 out of 5 stars. Asha Prakash of The Times of India rated 2.5 out of 5 stars. She appreciated the performances of Prithviraj and Parvathy, visuals and music, but felt that the film had too much cinematic cliches. The Indian Express reviewer Manoj Kumar R. had the impression that Jay's characterization was unconvincing and his "repugnant personality" was "sugarcoated" by the filmmaker. He rated 2 out of 5 stars. Sowmya Rajendran of The News Minute praised Prithviraj and Parvathy's performances, at the same time, said the characters suffer from unequal writing. The film was a box-office bomb.

References

External links

2018 films
2010s Malayalam-language films
Films shot in Portugal
Indian romance films
2018 romance films
Films set in Portugal
Films scored by Shaan Rahman